Men of the Timberland is a 1941 American film starring Richard Arlen and Andy Devine. It was part of their Aces of Action series at Universal.

Paul Jarrico worked on the script. He later said the film "dealt with the fight Richard Arlen, Andy Devine and some Dead-End-type kids in the Civilian Conservation Corps put up against the timber barons. Premature environmentalism." The script was rewritten but Jarrico kept story credit.

The Los Angeles Times said "Andy Devine is delightful."

Cast list
 Richard Arlen as Dick O'Hara
 Andy Devine as Andy Jensen
 Linda Hayes as Kay Hadley
 Francis McDonald as Jean Collet
 Willard Robertson as Tim MacGregor
 Paul E. Burns as Lucky
 Gaylord Pendleton as Tex
 Hardie Albright as Jim Dudley
 Riley Hill (credited as Roy Harris) as Withers
 John Ellis as Ranger

References

External links
Men of the Timberland at IMDb
Men of the Timberland at TCMDB
Men of the Timberland at BFI

1941 films
American action films
1940s action films
American black-and-white films
Universal Pictures films
Films directed by John Rawlins
Films set in forests
Films about lumberjacks
1940s English-language films
1940s American films